Stephen J Martin (born 3 March 1971 in Dublin) is an Irish writer of contemporary comic fiction.

Martin grew up in Raheny, Dublin. He graduated with a Bachelor of Engineering from Dublin City University. Having spent several years working in IT in the Far East, he became a full-time writer in 2002.

Having graduated from college with a degree in Electronic Engineering, Stephen J Martin worked in Japan for eight years . During this time he became involved in a local amateur theatre group, The Hiberian Players. He directed plays by Joseph O'Connor and Seán O'Casey and acted in Roddy Doyle's Brownbread and Dermot Bolger's one-man play, In High Germany. Also during this time, he was the singer in a local Tokyo-based rock band, Yer Mot's a Dog, touring extensively throughout Asia with the band.

Martin cites these literary and musical influences when asked about his decision to take up writing despite having had no formal background in the Arts. The Superchick trilogy largely draws on his experiences as the singer in a band and is a comic look at the behind-the-scenes challenges of touring and performing .

He is a fluent Irish-speaker and regularly appears on Irish-language radio and TV programs.

Stephen J Martin is married and currently lives with his wife in Hong Kong.

Bibliography 

 The Superchick Trilogy:
 Superchick (2002) — Jimmy Collins, middle manager by day, suburban rock star by night, enlists the help of his friends to find the perfect woman.
 Rock and a Hard Place (2006) — With The Grove finally achieving commercial success in Ireland, Jimmy must choose between his career and his music.
 Ride On (2007) — The trappings of fame and fortune start to catch up with The Grove. Jimmy and Aesop find themselves in need of help from an old friend.

External links 
 Author's own Web Site
 Publisher's web page for this author

1971 births
People from Raheny
People from County Dublin
Irish novelists
Irish male novelists
Living people